The One Tower is a 47-floor tower in the heart of Al Barsha Heights, Sheikh Zayed Road, Dubai, United Arab Emirates which is one of the most beneficial locations for business with direct access to Dubai Internet City Metro Station through Podium 1 of the building. The One Tower is positioned strategically at the most lucrative spot for business in Dubai. The One Tower is within reach of many major business sectors like Jebel Ali Free Zone, Dubai International Financial Centre, Dubai Internet City, Dubai Media City, Dubai World Trade Centre, Business Bay and Dubai International Airport.

External links
Emporis
The One Tower

Skyscraper office buildings in Dubai
Buildings and structures in Dubai Media City
High-tech architecture
Postmodern architecture